St. John's Preparatory School can refer to:

 St. John's Preparatory School (Harare) an independent preparatory school in Zimbabwe.
 St. John's Preparatory School (Massachusetts)
 Saint John's Preparatory School (Minnesota)
 St. John's Preparatory School (Queens)